The Kinneret Subdistrict is one of the subdistricts of Israel's Northern District. The subdistrict is the successor of the historical Mandatory Tiberias Subdistrict, and thus is also known as Tiberas Subdistrict. The largest city and the centre of the subdistrict is the city of Tiberias on the western coast of the Sea of Galilee.

References